Small evening primrose is a common name for several flowering plants and may refer to:

Camissoniopsis micrantha, endemic to California
Eremothera minor (syn. Camissonia minor)
Oenothera perennis, native to the eastern United States and Canada